Svitlyi Luch is a village in Ukraine, in the Kalmiuske Raion of Donetsk Oblast. As of 2001, the population was 41.

Demographics 
As of the 2001 Ukrainian Census, 36.59% of the population spoke Ukrainian, 58.54% spoke Russian, and 4.88% spoke Belarusian.

Notable Residents 
 Aleksandr Garkavets, linguist, philologist, and Turkologist

References 

Donetsk Oblast